Heavy Load is the first album by the duo New Kingdom, released in 1993.

The singles "Good Times" and "Cheap Thrills" made the top 100 on the UK Singles Chart.

Production
The album was produced by Scott Harding, New Kingdom, and the Lumberjacks. It was recorded in Manhattan.

Critical reception

Vibe called the album "a celebration of the black-light world of the subconscious," noting the "drug-induced lyrics swimming through a jazzmospheric haze." Spin thought that the group "could be Cypress Hill's geeky, inward-peeking younger brothers."

The Calgary Herald deemed the album "a happenin' hip-hop funky fury." The Province considered it "a record that favors low, thick, swinging rhythms over big beats, storytelling over boasting, characterization over gangsta posturing." The Boston Herald wrote that the group "turn a pop-music grab bag, with samples of Miles Davis, Grand Funk and others, into ... metallic R&B."

AllMusic wrote that "songs like 'Mad Mad World' and 'Mighty Maverick' work especially well, with Sebastian's trippy spoken-word poetry matching the psychedelic musical backgrounds to create the drugged-out feel the band seems to strive for." In a retrospective article, The Village Voice praised the "dusty sonic patina that was fond of incorporating reverse reverb," writing that "at times, New Kingdom resonated like a psychedelic Wu-Tang."

Track listing

Personnel
Jason "Nosaj" Furlow – vocals
Sebastian Laws – vocals

References

1993 albums
Gee Street Records albums
New Kingdom (band) albums